Matina is a canton in the Limón province of Costa Rica. The head city is in Matina district.

History 
Matina was created on 24 June 1969 by decree 4344.

Geography 
Matina has an area of  km² and a mean elevation of  metres.

The canton includes the Caribbean coast between the mouths of the Pacuare River to the north and the Toro River to the south. It lies between the Madre de Dios River on the northwest side and the Toro River on the east, and ranges as far south at the Boyei River in the Cordillera de Talamanca.

Districts 
The canton of Matina is subdivided into the following districts:
 Matina
 Batán
 Carrandi

Demographics 

For the 2011 census, Matina had a population of  inhabitants.

Transportation

Road transportation 
The canton is covered by the following road routes:

References 

Cantons of Limón Province
Populated places in Limón Province